Mfilou is one of the arrondissements of Brazzaville, capital of Republic of Congo.

References 

Geography of Brazzaville